The November 1843 Salisbury by-election was an election held on 24 November 1843. The by-election was brought about due to the death of the incumbent Conservative MP, Wadham Wyndham. It was won by the Conservative candidate John Campbell.

References

1843 in England
1843 elections in the United Kingdom
By-elections to the Parliament of the United Kingdom in Wiltshire constituencies
May 1843 events
Politics of Salisbury
19th century in Wiltshire